The 2013–14 Liga Leumit was the fifteenth season since its introduction in 1999 and the 72nd season of second-tier football in Israel. It began on 8 September 2013 and will end in May 2014.

A total of sixteen teams are contesting in the league, including twelve sides from the 2012–13 season, two promoted team from the 2012–13 Liga Alef and two relegated teams from the 2012–13 Israeli Premier League.

Changes from 2012–13 season

Team changes

Maccabi Petah Tikva, and Hapoel Ra'anana, were promoted to the 2013–14 Israeli Premier League.

Maccabi Netanya, and Hapoel Ramat Gan were directly relegated to the 2013–14 Liga Leumit after finishing the 2012–13 Israeli Premier League season in the bottom two places.

Sektzia Nes Tziona, and Hapoel Kfar Saba were directly relegated to Liga Alef after finishing in the previous season in last two league places. They were replaced by Hapoel Afula who finished first in Liga Alef North, and Hapoel Katamon who finished first in Liga Alef South.

Overview

Stadia and locations

While Afula Municipal Stadium is under construction. Hapoel Afula will host their home games in Green Stadium. The club is playing their home games at a neutral venue because their own ground does not meet Premier League requirements.While Yavne Municipal Stadium is under construction. Maccabi Yavne will host their home games in Ness Ziona Stadium until January 2014.

Regular season

Playoffs
Key numbers for pairing determination (number marks position after 30 games):

Top Playoff

Bottom Playoff

Relegation playoff
The 14th-placed Hapoel Katamon Jerusalem faced 2013–14 Liga Alef promotion play-offs winner, Ironi Tiberias. The matches took place on May 23 and 27, 2014.

Ironi Tiberias won 5–1 on aggregate and promoted to Liga Leumit. Hapoel Katamon Jerusalem relegated to Liga Alef.

Hat-tricks

 4 Player scored 4 goals

Season statistics

Top scorers

Updated: 14 May 2014Source: Israel Football Association

Scoring
First goal of the season:  Matan Lutati for Beitar Tel Aviv Ramla against Maccabi Herzliya, 90+3' minute (8 September 2013)
Most goals in a match by one player: 4 goals – 
 Osei Mawuli for Hapoel Ashkelon against Maccabi Umm al-Fahm (15 November 2013)
 Moshe Ben Lulu for Hapoel Bnei Lod against Maccabi Umm al-Fahm (27 December 2013)

Discipline
First yellow card of the season:  Omer Reps for Maccabi Herzliya against Beitar Tel Aviv Ramla, 45th minute (8 September 2013)
First red card of the season:  Maoz Samia for Hapoel Jerusalem against Hapoel Rishon LeZion, 54th minute (8 September 2013)

See also
 2013–14 Israel State Cup

References

2
Liga Leumit seasons
Isr